The Laz is a left tributary of the river Sebiș in Romania. It flows into the Sebiș near the town Sebiș.

References

Rivers of Romania
Rivers of Arad County